Munnur is a census town in Dakshina Kannada district in the Indian state of Karnataka.

Demographics
 India census, Munnur had a population of 8035. Males constitute 48% of the population and females 52%. Munnur has an average literacy rate of 77%, higher than the national average of 59.5%: male literacy is 82%, and female literacy is 73%. In Munnur, 12% of the population is under 6 years of age.

References

Cities and towns in Dakshina Kannada district